The following is a list of FCC-licensed radio stations in the U.S. state of Pennsylvania, which can be sorted by their call signs, frequencies, cities of license, licensees, and programming formats.

List of radio stations

Defunct
 KYW-FM
 WASP
 WBEM
 WBGI
 WBYN
 WDNR
 WFBM-LP
 WFTE
 WGEV
 WHYU-LP
 WHZN
 WISL
 WJMW
 WKVR-FM
 WKZV
 WLOG
 WNAP
 WNCC
 WOYL
 WPAM
 WPLY
 WQLE
 WQDD-LP
 WRDD
 WSAJ
 WTAC
 WVSL
 WWSM
 WYBF
 WZSK
 WZUM
 WZZE

References

 
Pennsylvania